Fucheng District is a district of Mianyang, Sichuan, China.

References

Districts of Sichuan
Mianyang